ZQ8 is an RPO code designation for the Chevrolet S-10, GMC Sonoma, and Chevrolet Colorado.

Chevrolet S-10 and GMC Sonoma
The ZQ8 option suspension package comes standard on the 1999-2003 S-10 Xtreme and 1996-1998 S-10 SS models, but was also available as a sports package on either the S-10 or GMC Sonoma. The package included a total lowered ride height of approximately 2" over stock (1.5" from suspension, ~0.5" from shorter tire diameter), thicker front sway bar (33mm), rear sway bar (23mm), quicker ratio (12:1) steering box, upgraded Decarbon or Bilstein gas shock absorbers, and a frame brace. Some ZQ8 models were also equipped with a frame to axle "anti-hop" shock.

The lowered stance was achieved using front coils with a different spring rate, and a 3-leaf rear spring pack.

Wheels and tires were also upgraded to  cast aluminum rim with 235/55/16 Goodyear Eagle GA tires. The Xtreme package used a different style rim than a standard truck equipped with the ZQ8 option. There are 2 versions of "ZQ8" wheels - 1996-2000 (also standard on 1996-1998 SS trucks), similar in design to 3rd generation Camaro wheels, and 2001-2003 (also used on Blazer Xtremes from 2004-2005), which bear a resemblance to an IROC Z28 wheel. Another variation among different models was in the center caps.  S-10s and Sonomas used a grey center cap with the exception of the 2002-2003 S-10s, which featured a chrome center cap.

The suspension package can be retrofit to any 1982-2003 2wd S-Series truck, although some parts require modification, such as drilling for sway bar mounts or boring the hub on the wheels for a 1982-1993 truck. Also of note, since the package came on I4 and V6 trucks, spring rates in the coils do vary.

Chevrolet